The transversospinales are a group of muscles of the human back. Their combined action is rotation and extension of the vertebral column. These muscles are small and have a poor mechanical advantage for contributing to motion. They include:
  the three semispinalis muscles, spanning 4-6 vertebral segments
 semispinalis thoracis
 semispinalis cervicis
 semispinalis capitis
 multifidus, spanning 2-4 vertebral segments
 rotatores, spanning 1-2 vertebral segments
 rotatores cervicis
 rotatores thoracis
 rotatores lumborum

External links
 Musculoskeletal Interventions: Techniques for Therapeutic exercise. Authors: Michael L. Voight, Barabara J. Hoogenboom, William E. Prentice.

Muscles of the torso